Maytime or As Once in May (German: Wie einst im Mai) is a 1926 German silent romance film directed by Willi Wolff and starring Adolf Klein, Ellen Richter, and Paul Heidemann.

The film's sets were designed by the art director Paul Leni.

Cast
 Adolf Klein as Baron de la Roche  
 Ellen Richter as Eugenie de la Roche / Eugenie Schönlein, geb. de la Roche & Charlotte, ihre Enkelin / Mabel Ward  
 Paul Heidemann as Friedrich Wilhelm Kietz / Fritz, Freds Sohn  
 Hugo Fischer-Köppe as Gottlieb Krause / Gottlieb  
 Frida Richard as Auguste Krause, Ehefrau / Auguste  
 Philipp Manning as Kammergerichtsrat Schönlein  
 Karl Harbacher as Romeo 
 Trude Hesterberg as Julia 
 Walter Rilla as Fred W. Kietz  
 Gyula Szőreghy as Adolph Lemke  
 Alice Torning as Frau Lemke  
 Hermann Picha as Theophil 
 Camilla Spira as Minchen Lemke, die Tochter

References

Bibliography
 Grange, William. Cultural Chronicle of the Weimar Republic. Scarecrow Press, 2008.
 Krautz, Alfred. International directory of cinematographers, set- and costume designers in film, Volume 4. Saur, 1984.

External links

1926 films
Films of the Weimar Republic
German silent feature films
Films directed by Willi Wolff
Films based on operettas
Films set in the 19th century
UFA GmbH films
German black-and-white films
1920s historical romance films
German historical romance films
1920s German films
1920s German-language films
Silent historical romance films